Waterloo Bay is an area of foreshore in Larne on the east coast of County Antrim, Northern Ireland. It is of particular interest to geologists because it provides a clear, complete and accessible example of the sequences from Upper Triassic to Lower Jurassic, when the rock types changed from land to marine.

Geology

Early investigation
Joseph Ellison Portlock studied the Triassic and Jurassic rocks of Ireland in 1843 as part of his engagement by Ordnance Survey Ireland.

In 1864 Ralph Tate made an investigation of the Triassic rocks of County Antrim, which he reported to the Geological Society of London.

Status and significance
Because the location provides an unusually clear, complete and accessible example of the sequences from Upper Triassic to Lower Jurassic, when the rock types changed from land to marine, Waterloo Bay was designated an Area of Special Scientific Interest for its geological importance in 1995.

In 2007, it was a candidate for Global Boundary Stratotype Section and Point (also known as a GSSP, or 'golden spike') to mark the base of the Jurassic system and Hettangian stage. although the Kujoch in Austria was chosen instead.

The "Larne Sea Dragon"
In 1999, an ichthyosaur, also popularly known as the 'Larne Sea Dragon' or 'Minnis Monster'  was found in the Langport Member strata by Brian McGee. Remains were found of the backbone and rib cage, scattered pieces of the front limbs, the lower jaw, and several teeth. These were uncovered by fossil preparator Andy Cowap and put on display in the Ulster Museum.

From 2007-9, while the Ulster Museum was undergoing refurbishment, the ichthyosaur was exhibited in Larne Tourist Information Centre.

Public right of way
The promenade, a footpath between the foreshore and the low cliffs at Waterloo, is a public right of way.

Gallery

See also
Geology of Northern Ireland
List of rock formations in the United Kingdom

References 

Protected areas of County Antrim
Geology of Northern Ireland
Geology of Ireland
Stratigraphy of the United Kingdom
Rock formations of Northern Ireland